Arthur Jugnot (born 2 December 1980) is a French actor and stage director.

Personal life
He is the son of  Gérard Jugnot and Cécile Magnan.

Filmography

Theatre

References

External links

 

French male film actors
1980 births
Living people
Male actors from Paris
20th-century French male actors
French male stage actors
French male television actors